Nagai Island is one of the largest of the Shumagin Islands in the Gulf of Alaska, south of the Alaska Peninsula considered a part of the NE Aleutian Range.

According to the log of Vitus Bering's ship St. Peter, a sailor by the name of Nikita Shumagin died of scurvy and was buried here August 31, 1741. The Shumagin Islands were named after him.

References

Shumagin Islands
Aleutian Range
Islands of Alaska
Islands of Aleutians East Borough, Alaska